Waposite Lake is a body of water in the Broadback River watershed in the Eeyou Istchee James Bay (municipality) area in the Nord-du-Québec, in the province of Quebec, in Canada. This lake is part of the territory of Assinica Wildlife Sanctuary and Turgis Township.

Forestry is the main economic activity of the sector. Recreational tourism activities come second.

The surface of Waposite Lake is usually frozen from early November to mid-May, however, safe ice movement is generally from mid-November to mid-April.

Geography

Toponymy
In the past, this water body was called "Wasawapositeo Lake".

The toponym "Lac Waposite" was formalized on December 5, 1968, by the Commission de toponymie du Québec, when it was created.

Notes and references

See also 

Eeyou Istchee James Bay
Lakes of Nord-du-Québec
LWaposite